Edward Marion Sadowski (February 2, 1915 – March 11, 1992) was an American professional basketball player. He played for the Indianapolis Kautskys, Toledo Jim White Chevrolets, and Sheboygan Red Skins in the National Basketball League (NBL) and averaged 4.8 points per game. In 1942–43 he won the NBL championship while playing for the Red Skins.

Sadowski was born in Massachusetts and played basketball and football for the University of Notre Dame. He is often confused with Ed Sadowski, who also played in the NBL (although they are unrelated). The latter Sadowski played collegiately at Seton Hall University.

References

1915 births
1992 deaths
American men's basketball players
Basketball players from Massachusetts
Guards (basketball)
Indianapolis Kautskys players
Notre Dame Fighting Irish football players
Notre Dame Fighting Irish men's basketball players
People from Westfield, Massachusetts
Sheboygan Red Skins players
Toledo Jim White Chevrolets players